= Eosinophilic dermatosis =

- Specialty: Dermatology

Eosinophilic dermatosis is a form of dermatosis characterized by a preponderance of eosinophils in the dermis or epidermis.

Although it does not always imply a specific etiology, it is still commonly used as a classification in dermatology when more information about the condition is not known.
